The 2020 FINA Men's Water Polo World League was the 19th edition of the annual men's international water polo tournament. It was played between November 2019 and July 2021 and open to all men's water polo national teams. After participating in a preliminary round, eight teams qualified to play in a final tournament, called the Super Final, originally scheduled from 23 to 28 June 2020. The tournament was postponed due to the COVID-19 pandemic. In August 2020, it was announced that it would be played in from January to July 2021.

Montenegro won their third overall title, after defeating the United States in the final.

In the world league, there are specific rules that do not allow matches to end in a draw. If teams are level at the end of the 4th quarter of any world league match, the match will be decided by a penalty shootout. The following points will be awarded per match to each team:

 Match won – 3 points
 Match won by penalty – 2 points
 Match lost by penalty – 1 point
 Match lost or forfeited – 0 points

European qualification

Preliminary round
 12 November 2019 – 11 February 2020
The preliminary round was played in the Round-robin system.

Group A

Group B

Group C

Group D

Final round
 8–10 January 2021, Debrecen, Hungary

Bracket

5th–8th place bracket

Final ranking

Inter-Continental Cup
 24 – 31 May 2021, Indianapolis, United States — cancelled

Super final

As host country
 

Qualified teams

Invited teams

Preliminary round
All times are local (UTC+4).

Group A

Group B

Knockout stage

Bracket

5th–8th place bracket

Quarterfinals

5–8th place semifinals

Semifinals

Seventh place game

Fifth place game

Third place game

Final

Final ranking

Awards
The awards were announced on 1 July 2021.

References

External links

Super final – Results book

FINA Water Polo World League
World League, men
World League, men
World League, men
Water polo